Wulfila Glacier is located on the southern slopes of Breznik Heights, Greenwich Island in the South Shetland Islands, Antarctica, south-southwest of Solis Glacier and west of Zheravna Glacier.  It is bounded by Oborishte Ridge to the northwest, Nevlya Peak to the north, Terter Peak and Razgrad Peak to the northeast, and Ephraim Bluff to the southeast. The glacier extends 3 km in northwest-southeast direction and 2 km in northeast-southwest direction. It drains southwestwards into McFarlane Strait between Ephraim Bluff and the base of Provadiya Hook, feeding the head of Doris Cove.

The feature is named after Bishop Wulfila (311-383 AD) of Nicopolis ad Istrum (the present Bulgarian settlement of Nikyup near Veliko Tarnovo) who created the Gothic alphabet, and laid the foundations of the Germanic literature.

Location

See also
 Breznik Heights
 Greenwich Island
 List of glaciers in the Antarctic
 Glaciology

Maps
 South Shetland Islands. Scale 1:200000 topographic map. DOS 610 Sheet W 62 58. Tolworth, UK, 1968.
 South Shetland Islands. Scale 1:200000 topographic map. DOS 610 Sheet W 62 60. Tolworth, UK, 1968.
 L.L. Ivanov et al. Antarctica: Livingston Island and Greenwich Island, South Shetland Islands. Scale 1:100000 topographic map. Sofia: Antarctic Place-names Commission of Bulgaria, 2005.
 L.L. Ivanov. Antarctica: Livingston Island and Greenwich, Robert, Snow and Smith Islands. Scale 1:120000 topographic map.  Troyan: Manfred Wörner Foundation, 2009.  
 Antarctic Digital Database (ADD). Scale 1:250000 topographic map of Antarctica. Scientific Committee on Antarctic Research (SCAR). Since 1993, regularly updated.
 L.L. Ivanov. Antarctica: Livingston Island and Smith Island. Scale 1:100000 topographic map. Manfred Wörner Foundation, 2017.

References
 Wulfila Glacier SCAR Composite Antarctic Gazetteer
 Bulgarian Antarctic Gazetteer. Antarctic Place-names Commission. (details in Bulgarian, basic data in English)

External links
 Wulfila Glacier. Copernix satellite image

Glaciers of Greenwich Island